Worms 3 is an artillery turn-based tactics video game in the Worms series developed and published by Team17 for iOS on August 8, 2013, and released for Android devices via the Play Store and Mac OS X computers in 2014.

Plot
Story mode consists of twenty seven single player missions across four themes: Beach, Spooky, Farmyard and Sewer.

Gameplay
Gameplay follows on the earlier games of the series, in which teams of worms take turns to use a variety of weapons and items in order to eliminate the opposing teams.

Worms 3 is the first Worms game to feature card mode, which allows the player to alter the start and end of each turn. There are forty one cards in total, which must be collected first by unlocking in-game rewards and purchasing them. There are also four different worms classes, which first appeared in Worms Revolution, and new weapons.

Multiplayer and online modes are available, along with Bodycount mode, a new mode which challenges the player to beat their friend's score in challenges.

Reception

Worms 3 received positive reviews. It has a score of 74/100 on Metacritic.

GamesMaster gave the game 90/100 and a gold award, praising the new card mode and called the multiplayer "so good it'll make you squirm in delight" Digital Spy's Scott Nichols gave the game 4/5, stating the while the game wasn't groundbreaking for the series, he praised the multiplayer mode and stated that the game "hits the right notes to offer fans the complete Worms experience on the go". Pocket Gamer's Harry Slater gave the game 4/5 and a silver award, praising its single-player and multiplayer modes but criticised the AI  and stated that non-Worms fans would remain unimpressed. Gamezebo's Joe Jasko gave the game 4/5, praising the cards and amount of weapons but criticised the lack of tutorials for some weapons and game objects and level designs. Modojo's John Bedford also gave the game 4/5, stating that the game twisted the established Worms gameplay, but was "familiar enough to keep long-time fans happy". He criticised the sometimes choppy performance and lack of customization of the player's worms. Apple'N'Apps, however, gave the game 1/5, criticising the touch controls and gameplay and stated that the series "should have stayed in the past".

Awards
 GamesMaster gold award.
 Pocket Gamer silver award.

References

2013 video games
Android (operating system) games
Artillery video games
IOS games
MacOS games
Multiplayer video games
Strategy video games
Video games developed in the United Kingdom
Worms games